The athletics competition in the 1954 Central American and Caribbean Games were held in Mexico City, Mexico.

Medal summary

Men's events

Women's events

Medal table

References

 
 
 

Athletics at the Central American and Caribbean Games
Central American and Caribbean Games
1954 CAC Games
1954 Central American and Caribbean Games